Haviland Smith is a retired CIA station chief who worked in Prague, Berlin, Langley, Beirut, and Tehran, primarily on issues related to the Soviet Union.  He also served as chief of the counterrorism staff and as executive assistant to the Deputy Director of the Central Intelligence Agency Frank Carlucci.  He is a graduate of Exeter, Dartmouth College, and the University of London. He served in the U.S. Army at the United States Army Security Agency before joining the CIA.

Special techniques
He was the creator of espionage techniques used by the CIA during the Cold War in the Soviet Union and East Europe, including the brush contact and the creation and manipulation of the "gap".

Post CIA career
Since his retirement, he has contributed Op-eds to local New England papers as well as The Boston Globe, the Hartford Courant, The Baltimore Sun and The Washington Post. He has also written regularly for Nieman Watchdog and American Diplomacy and has lectured around the Eastern U.S. on Russia, the Soviet Union, the Middle East, Terrorism and the intelligence process.

Sources 
 Ex-CIA Officer Will Visit DCC to Give Lecture on Middle East, a lecture broadcast on C-SPAN.
 Mini Biography, on the American Diplomacy website.
 https://books.google.com/books?id=2_kmzYET9VkC&pg=PA422&lpg=PA422&dq=%22Haviland+Smith%22&source=bl&ots=NUF-Z8Ej3c&sig=OkAOWoPlASIUGqMbpq8FIHpQzUY&hl=en&ei=cVstTLK2MMKC8gbmpdiAAw&sa=X&oi=book_result&ct=result&resnum=3&ved=0CCIQ6AEwAjj6AQ
 https://web.archive.org/web/20110928075944/http://www.exeter.edu/documents/Exeter_Bulletin/SP10_Profile_Smith.pdf
 http://www.niemanwatchdog.org/index.cfm?fuseaction=about.viewcontributors&bioid=236
http://www.c-spanvideo.org/program/283698-1
https://web.archive.org/web/20100708030840/http://bakerinstitute.org/events/challenges-for-clandestine-intelligence-collection-in-support-of-u.s.-middle-east-policy
http://www.c-spanvideo.org/program/283698-1

People of the Central Intelligence Agency
Dartmouth College alumni
Alumni of the University of London
People from Williston, Vermont
Living people
Year of birth missing (living people)